Brownson is an unincorporated community in Cheyenne County, Nebraska, United States.

History
Brownson was named for a former general freight agent of the Union Pacific Railroad. A post office called Bronson (without the W) operated from 1887 until 1895.

References

Populated places in Cheyenne County, Nebraska
Unincorporated communities in Nebraska